Karl Alfred Walther Schieck (1874-1946) was a German politician who served as the last Minister-President of Saxony during the Weimar Republic.

Biography 
After studying law in Heidelberg, Munich, and Leipzig, Schieck worked from 1906 in the Saxon Ministry of Finance. Schieck was a member of the DVP and was elected Minister-President of Saxony on 6 May 1930. His cabinet consisted mostly of differing parties. As Minister-President, he also served as the Minister of Education. Schieck resigned on 13 May 1930, but legally held the office until his dismissal in 1933. He was buried in the Johannisfriedhof in Dresden.

References 

1874 births
1946 deaths
Ministers-President of Saxony
Politicians from Dresden
German People's Party politicians